Cabots Landing Provincial Park (official spelling Cabot's Landing Provincial Park) is a small picnic and beach park on the shore of Aspy Bay in the community of Sugarloaf,  north of the Cabot Trail on Cape Breton Island, Nova Scotia, Canada.

The park is managed by the provincial Department of Natural Resources and features picnic tables in an open field on a bluff overlooking a mile-long red sand public beach fronting Aspy Bay, featuring scenic vistas of the steep face of the Pollets Cove-Aspy Fault Wilderness Area.

It is believed by some sources that Italian explorer John Cabot (Giovanni Caboto) landed at Aspy Bay in 1497. Cabots Landing Provincial Park features a National Historic Site cairn and bust commemorating the landfall. There is a pioneer cemetery in the park. Cabots Landing Provincial Park was established by Order in Council (OIC) 74-1378 on December 19, 1974.

The trailhead is at 46°57'11.76"N, 60°27'39.66"W (N46 57.196 W060 27.661) and is marked by orange flagging tape and two yellow stones. The trail offers two different mountain-top overlooks. This trail lies on privately owned land.

The park is open for day use (from dawn to dusk), from May 15 to October 12.

Civic address: 1904 Bay St. Lawrence Rd., Sugarloaf, Nova Scotia.

References

External links
Wilkie Sugarloaf on Geocaching.com
Wilkie Sugarloaf near Ingonish, NS

Provincial parks of Nova Scotia
Tourist attractions in Victoria County, Nova Scotia
Geography of Victoria County, Nova Scotia
Protected areas established in 1974
1974 establishments in Nova Scotia